Bahiopsis parishii known commonly as Parish goldeneye or shrubby goldeneye, is a North American species of flowering shrubs in the family Asteraceae.

It is native to the southwestern United States, (southern California, southern Nevada, Arizona, and southwestern New Mexico), as well as adjacent parts of northwest Mexico (Baja California, Baja California Sur, and Sonora).

Description
Bahiopsis parishii grows to 2 feet tall, with bright yellow flowers. It blooms after periods of rain, both in spring and in fall, or after the monsoon season in Arizona.

Etymology
The species name honors either of two brothers, Samuel Bonsall Parish (1838–1928) and William Fletcher Parish (1840–1918), both active botanists in southern California.  It is closely related to Bahiopsis deltoidea and is sometimes considered a variety of that species.

References

External links

Jepson Manual Treatment
Calphotos Photo gallery, University of California

Heliantheae
North American desert flora
Flora of the Southwestern United States
Flora of Northwestern Mexico
Flora of the California desert regions
Natural history of the Mojave Desert
Plants described in 1882
Flora without expected TNC conservation status